was an admiral in the Imperial Japanese Navy during World War II.

Biography

Early career
Abe was born in Yonezawa city in Yamagata prefecture in northern Japan. He graduated from the 39th class of the Imperial Japanese Naval Academy in 1911, with a ranking of 26th out of a class of 148 cadets. As a midshipman, he served on the cruiser  and battleship .

After attending torpedo school and naval artillery school, he was promoted to sub-lieutenant and served on the destroyer , followed by the cruiser  during World War I. However, it does not appear that Abe experienced combat during his tour of duty.

After the end of the war, he served in mostly staff positions until he was given his first command on 20 July 1922; the destroyer Ushio. He then commanded the destroyer , and was promoted to lieutenant commander the following year on 1 December 1923. He was captain of the destroyer  for one year in 1925.

Abe returned to the Naval Staff College in 1926. He was promoted to commander on 10 December 1928, and captain on 1 December 1932. In 1936, he assumed command of the cruiser , and a year later, that of the battleship .

Pacific War
On 15 November 1938, Abe was promoted to the rank of rear admiral. He was thus in command of Cruiser Division 8 (CruDiv8) during the attack on Pearl Harbor, and the subsequent Battle of Wake Island.

During the Guadalcanal campaign, as commander of Combat Division 11 (BatDiv 3 and CruDiv 8), he led his ships as the vanguard group at the Battle of the Eastern Solomons from 23–25 August 1942 and the Battle of the Santa Cruz Islands from 26–28 October. He was promoted to vice admiral on 1 November.

However, during the Naval Battle of Guadalcanal on 12–13 November, when assigned to bombard Henderson Field on Guadalcanal, he broke off his attack after encountering and almost completely crippling in 40 minutes of intense combat U.S. Navy Rear Admiral Daniel Callaghan's Task Group 67.4 (TG 67.4). Abe lost his flagship, the battleship , which he ordered scuttled after it had been seriously damaged, as well as two destroyers. But he still had the undamaged battleship  to bombard Henderson field and enough destroyers to finish off damaged allied vessels. His failure to aggressively push through his attack against an inferior enemy force created tremendous controversy, and he was relieved of his command by Admiral Isoroku Yamamoto.

Abe was forced to resign from the Imperial Japanese Navy soon afterward in March 1943. He died in 1949.

His younger brother, was also a career navy officer, and was captain of the aircraft carrier . Abe went down with Shinano, when she was torpedoed and sunk by  while performing trials.

Notable positions held
 Crewmember, BB Kongō – 27 May 1914 – 1 December 1914
 Staff Officer, 3rd Fleet – 1 December 1919 – 10 November 1921
 Torpedo Officer, CL Tama – 10 May 1923 – 1 May 1924
 Senior Staff Officer, DesRon 2 – 30 November 1929 – 31 October 1931
 ComDesDiv 1 – 31 October 1931 – 16 May 1932
 ComDesDiv 2 – 15 November 1932 – 15 November 1933
 ComDesDiv 23 – 15 November 1933 – 15 November 1934
 Commanding Officer, CL Jintsu – 1 December 1936 – 1 December 1937
 Commanding Officer, BB Fusō – 1 December 1937 – 1 April 1938
 Commanding Officer, Air Group 14 - 1 April 1938 - 15 December 1938
 Chief Instructor of the Naval Academy - 15 December 1938 - 1 November 1940
 ComDesRon 6 – 15 November 1940 – 21 July 1941
 ComCruDiv 8 – 1 August 1941 – 14 July 1942
 ComBatDiv 11 – 14 July 1942 – 20 December 1942

Dates of promotions
 Midshipman – 18 July 1911
 Ensign – 1 December 1912
 Sublieutenant – 1 December 1914
 Lieutenant – 1 December 1917
 Lieutenant Commander – 1 December 1923
 Commander – 10 December 1928
 Captain – 1 December 1932
 Rear Admiral – 15 November 1938
 Vice Admiral – 1 November 1942

References

Books

Notes

External links

1889 births
1949 deaths
People from Yamagata Prefecture
Japanese admirals of World War II
Imperial Japanese Navy admirals
Battle of Midway